Bertha "Puck" Brouwer (later van Duyne; 29 October 1930 – 6 October 2006) was a Dutch sprinter.

Brouwer accomplished her first international notable result in 1950, when she won the silver medal at the European Championships, being part of the 4×100 metres relay team alongside Fanny Blankers-Koen. She competed at the 1952 Summer Olympics in the 100 m, 200 m and 4×100 m relay, and won a silver medal in the 200 m. A third silver medal was added in 1954, when she finished second on the 100 m at the European Championships in Bern. She also was a member of the Dutch team for the 1956 Summer Olympics; however the Dutch decided to boycott the Games, and Van Duyne, who was already in Melbourne, had to go home. Disappointed, she shortly afterwards retired from competitions.

References 

1930 births
2006 deaths
Dutch female sprinters
Athletes (track and field) at the 1952 Summer Olympics
European Athletics Championships medalists
Olympic athletes of the Netherlands
Olympic silver medalists for the Netherlands
People from Leidschendam
Medalists at the 1952 Summer Olympics
Olympic silver medalists in athletics (track and field)
Olympic female sprinters
Sportspeople from South Holland